Tinagma minutissima is a moth in the  family Douglasiidae.  It is found in Turkey, Ukraine (the Crimea) and Russia (Volgograd).

References

Moths described in 1880
Douglasiidae